Juan Carlos Miguel Mendoza (born April 28, 1982) is a former swimmer from the Philippines. He represented his native country at the 2000 Summer Olympics where he beat the 400m freestyle record of fellow Filipino athlete Ryan Papa. He also represented the Philippines in the 2004 Summer Olympics but ended the 1,500 meter freestyle heat at last place. A freestyle specialist, Mendoza is a 1,500 metres gold medalist at the Southeast Asian Games. Mendoza studied management information systems at the University of Georgia.

See also

 List of University of Georgia people

External links

References

1982 births
Filipino male freestyle swimmers
Georgia Bulldogs men's swimmers
Olympic swimmers of the Philippines
Swimmers at the 2000 Summer Olympics
Swimmers at the 2004 Summer Olympics
Living people
Swimmers at the 2002 Asian Games
Sportspeople from Manila
Southeast Asian Games medalists in swimming
Southeast Asian Games gold medalists for the Philippines
Southeast Asian Games silver medalists for the Philippines
Competitors at the 2001 Southeast Asian Games
Asian Games competitors for the Philippines
Competitors at the 2003 Southeast Asian Games